This Is Gonna Hurt is the second studio album by Sixx:A.M., a side project of Mötley Crüe bassist Nikki Sixx, released on May 3, 2011. Like the first album which served as a companion soundtrack to Nikki Sixx's first book The Heroin Diaries: A Year in the Life of a Shattered Rock Star, this album is a companion to the book of the same name, Sixx's second book, which was released on April 12, 2011. Unlike its predecessor, This Is Gonna Hurt does not feature any spoken word.

Release
The lead single from the album is "Lies of the Beautiful People" and was released on March 1, 2011. The first single "Lies of the Beautiful People" premiered on Sixx's radio show website "Sixx Sense" on February 16, 2011, and went on sale on March 1. The album was released on May 10, 2011, after being pushed back from a March 22, 2011, release date.

Reception

This Is Gonna Hurt debuted at #10 on the Billboard 200, selling 30,000 copies in its first week of release, and at #1 on the Hard Rock Charts.

Track listing

Charts

Personnel
The album's credits and personnel can be obtained from AllMusic.

Nikki Sixx – bass guitar, backing vocals
DJ Ashba – lead guitar, backing vocals
James Michael – vocals, rhythm guitar, keyboards, drums, strings
Additional personnel
Shahnaz – backing vocals

Production
 James Michael – production, engineering, mixing
 Dave Donnelly – mastering
 Kevin Llewellyn – cover painting
 Nikki Sixx – photography
 P. R. Brown – art design, photography

References

2011 albums
Sixx:A.M. albums
Concept albums
Book soundtracks
Eleven Seven Label Group albums